Ankit Narang (born 3 April 1989) is an Indian television actor. He is best known for playing the character of Soham Deshmukh in the popular soap opera Pavitra Rishta which aired on Zee TV. He was last seen in Zindagi Mere Ghar Aana.

Life and family
Narang was born on 3 April 1989 in Surat, Gujarat. On 24th June 2022, Narang got engaged to his girlfriend Valentina Chopra, who is a creative in Rajshri Productions.

Career
Narang started his acting career in 2011 with Life OK series Tum Dena Saath Mera. He then played prominent roles in several popular hindi television serials such as Pavitra Rishta, Bade Achhe Lagte Hain, Bhaage Re Mann and Divya Drishti.

In 2021, he was seen playing the parallel lead role of Angad Sakhuja opposite Chestha Mehta in Zindagi Mere Ghar Aana.

Filmography

Television

References

External links
 

1989 births
Living people
Indian male soap opera actors
Indian male television actors
Male actors from Mumbai
21st-century Indian male actors